The 1924–25 season was the 50th season of competitive football in England.

Honours

Notes = Number in parentheses is the times that club has won that honour. * indicates new record for competition

Football League

First Division

Second Division

Third Division North

Third Division South

Top goalscorers

First Division
Frank Roberts (Manchester City) – 31 goals

Second Division
Arthur Chandler (Leicester City) – 33 goals

Third Division North
David Brown (Darlington) – 39 goals

Third Division South
Jack Fowler (Swansea Town) – 28 goals

References